Ivesia kingii, sometimes reclassified as Potentilla kingii, is a species of flowering plant known by the common name King's mousetail.

It is native to the southwestern United States, where it is known from eastern California, Nevada, and Utah.

One variety of this species, var. eremica, is endemic to Ash Meadows in the Amargosa Desert, in Nye County, Nevada, on the California-Nevada border. It is federally listed as a threatened species of the United States.

References

External links

kingii
North American desert flora
Natural history of the Mojave Desert
Flora of California
Flora of Nevada
Flora of Utah
Endemic flora of the United States